Enrique Clay Creel Cuilty, sometimes known as Henry Clay Creel (30 August 1854 – 18 August 1931) was a Mexican businessman, politician and diplomat, member of the powerful Creel-Terrazas family of Chihuahua. He was a member of the Científicos, as well as founder and president of the Banco Central Mexicano, vice-president of Kansas City, Mexico and Orient Railway, as well as governor of Chihuahua on two occasions, ambassador of Mexico to the United States, and Minister of Foreign Affairs of President Porfirio Díaz in the last years of his regime.<ref>Mark Wasserman, "Enrique C. Creel: Business and Politics in Mexico, 1880-1930." Business History Review 59 (Winter 1985).</ref>  The foremost banker during the Porfirato (1876-1910) he is considered a symbol of the Porfirian regime.

Biography

Creel was the son of Reuben Creel, a veteran of the Mexican American War from Greensburg, Kentucky, and Abraham Lincoln's US Consul in Chihuahua. He was born in Ciudad Chihuahua and became son-in-law of Don Luis Terrazas by virtue of marriage to his daughter Angela (Reuben Creel and Luis Terrazas were married to sisters of the wealthy Cuilty family, whose ancestry was English and was related to Sir Thomas More).

After Porfirio Díaz became president of Mexico in 1876, he appointed Creel as a director of the National Board of Dynamite and Explosives. Mexico's demand for explosives was high because of its mining and railroad industries and the army's need for munitions. The board imposed an 80% import duty on dynamite, allowing its members to manufacture explosives without competition and reportedly enabling Creel to amass an even larger fortune in kickbacks.

In 1898, he founded the Banco Central Mexicano (of which he became president) alongside other members of the Científicos.

Enrique Creel served as Mexico's Minister of Foreign Relations and as its Ambassador to the United States. The bilingual Creel served as interpreter when Presidents Porfirio Díaz and William Howard Taft met in 1909 on the international bridge between Ciudad Juárez and El Paso. He became vice-president of the Kansas City, Mexico and Orient Railway, where he was responsible for the construction of part of the railroad west of Chihuahua, now the Chihuahua Pacific Railroad (Ferrocarril Chihuahua al Pacífico) which runs through the town of Creel, Chihuahua. He was a key intermediary between the Mexican government and foreign companies, serving on their boards, as well as helping arrange "government subsidies and tax abatements and financial support for foreign firms." His haciendas once totaled more than 1.7 million acres (6,900 km²). Creel was one of Díaz's advisers who had urged the president to be interviewed by James Creelman of Pearson's Magazine, in which Díaz declared he would not be a candidate for president in 1910.

The Mexican Revolution forced him to abandon Mexico for the United States and he had major financial losses due to the Revolution, with revolutionaries expropriating his landed estates. He returned after the end of the revolution, and served for a period in the administration of northern revolutionary general Alvaro Obregón (1920–24).  He died in Mexico City on August 18, 1931 .

Publications

 (Imports and Exports)
 (Agriculture and Agrarianism'')

See also
Creel-Terrazas Family, a powerful and wealthy family from Chihuahua founded by Luis Terrazas, his father-in-law.

References

Further reading
 
 

People from Chihuahua City
1854 births
1931 deaths
Mexican Secretaries of Foreign Affairs
Governors of Chihuahua (state)
Members of the Chamber of Deputies (Mexico)
Ambassadors of Mexico to the United States
Mexican people of German descent
Mexican people of English descent
Mexican people of American descent
Politicians from Chihuahua (state)
Liberalism in Mexico
Porfiriato
Mexican people of Irish descent
20th-century Mexican politicians